Fine Feathers is a 1937 British musical film directed by Leslie S. Hiscott and starring Stella Arbenina, Jack Hobbs, Renee Houston and Francis L. Sullivan. Its plot concerns a woman out on a picnic who becomes lost and stumbles across a gang who persuade her to impersonate the mistress of the Crown Prince of Boravia. It was made at Beaconsfield Studios.

Cast
 Stella Arbenina as Elizabeth 
 Jack Hobbs as Felix 
 Renee Houston as Teenie McPherson 
 Marcelle Rogez as Mme. Barescon
 Donald Stewart as	Jim Warren 
 Francis L. Sullivan as Hugo Steinway  
 Henry Victor as Gibbons 
 Robb Wilton as Tim McPherson

References

Bibliography
 Low, Rachael. Filmmaking in 1930s Britain. George Allen & Unwin, 1985.
 Wood, Linda. British Films, 1927-1939. British Film Institute, 1986.

External links
 

1937 films
British musical films
1930s English-language films
Films directed by Leslie S. Hiscott
1937 musical films
Films shot at Beaconsfield Studios
Films produced by Herbert Smith (producer)
British black-and-white films
1930s British films